Rory Horgan (born 1988) is an Irish hurler who plays as a right corner-back for the Kerry senior team.

Born in Ardfert, County Kerry, Horgan first arrived on the inter-county scene at the age of seventeen when he first linked up with the Kerry minor team before later joining the under-21 side. He made his senior debut during the 2012 Waterford Crystal Cup. Horgan quickly became a regular member of the starting fifteen and has won one Christy Ring Cup medal. He has been a Christy Ring Cup runner-up on one occasion.

As a Gaelic footballer with St Brendan's Horgan is a one-time All-Ireland medallist in the intermediate grade. In addition to this he has also won one Munster medal and one championship medal in the same grade. As a hurler Horgan is a one-time championship medallist in the senior grade.

Honours

Team
St Brendan's
All-Ireland Intermediate Club Football Championship (1): 2015
Munster Intermediate Club Football Championship (1): 2014
Kerry Intermediate Football Championship (1): 2014
Kerry Senior Hurling Championship (1): 2013

Kerry
Christy Ring Cup (1): 2015
National League (Division 2A) (1): 2015
All-Ireland Under 21 B Hurling Championship (1): 2009
All-Ireland Minor B Hurling Championship (1): 2006

References

1988 births
Living people
St Brendan's hurlers
St Brendan's (Kerry) Gaelic footballers
Kerry inter-county hurlers